Qareh Bolagh (also Romanized as Qareh Bolāgh; also known as Karabulag, Qara Bulāgh, Qarah Bowlāgh, Qara Tepe, and Qareh Tappeh) is a village in Ozomdel-e Jonubi Rural District, in the Central District of Varzaqan County, East Azerbaijan Province, Iran. At the 2006 census, its population was 237, in 53 families.

References 

Towns and villages in Varzaqan County